Basingstoke railway station serves the town of Basingstoke in the county of Hampshire in England. It is on the South West Main Line from London Waterloo, with local and fast services operated by South Western Railway. It is the terminus of Great Western Railway local services on the Reading to Basingstoke Line.

History 
The station was opened by the London and South Western Railway as a temporary terminus when its line to Southampton reached Basingstoke from London. It became a through station when the section running north from Southampton was completed later in 1840. The intention to build a line from near Basingstoke to Bristol was dropped when the Great Western Railway was approved. The L&SWR did, however plan a line to Salisbury from Basingstoke but this was delayed by financial difficulties. Eventually, it was built reaching  in 1854 and  three years later, before being extended to become the West of England Main Line.

After its conversion to mixed gauge on 22 December 1856 through services could run between Southampton and Reading. The broad gauge rail was removed on 1 April 1869.
The GWR station was closed on 1 January 1932 and demolished the same year. Since then trains from Reading have used the main station.

Basingstoke station was the terminus of the Basingstoke and Alton Light Railway, opened in 1901 to prevent the GWR from building a line on this route towards Portsmouth. The line was never profitable. During the First World War some of the track was sold off. After the war the Southern Railway  reopened the line, but it was closed finally in 1932.

In the 1980s Platform 5 was converted to a bay platform to permit an entrance on the northern side by British Rail. In 1993, an explosive device planted by the Provisional Irish Republican Army was found in a toilet, soon after a bomb scare at Reading railway station. In 2001 a suitcase was left outside the station containing the mutilated body of a man in his twenties.  He had been stabbed to death.

Anglia Railways ran the London Crosslink service from Ipswich to Basingstoke via Stratford and the North London Line using Class 170s between May 2000 and September 2002. South West Trains also ran a local service from Reading to Brighton until timetable changes on 9 December 2007. Southern railway services from Southampton and Portsmouth to Brighton were improved to compensate for that.

In 2012  improvements were made to the station , including a new stainless steel and glass frontage, an enlarged booking hall and a new waiting room on platforms 2 and 3. In 2022, South Western Railway introduced staff members called "Welcome Hosts" at this station and some others to provide information and sell tickets.

Platforms 
The station has five platforms, four of which can be used bi-directionally. They are above street level and are accessed via stairs and lifts from the booking hall and subway. There is a secondary entrance on Platform 4.

Platform 1: Terminating slow services to and from London Waterloo, westbound CrossCountry services to Southampton and Bournemouth and occasionally regional services to Southampton and Poole. Westbound freight trains also pass through here.
Platform 2: Westbound services on the South West Main Line and West of England Main Line
Platform 3: Fast trains to London Waterloo.
Platform 4: Northbound CrossCountry services to Reading, Birmingham and onwards to the north. A few trains to London Waterloo use this platform. Northbound freight trains also pass through here.
Platform 5: Bay platform for stopping services to Reading on the Reading to Basingstoke Line, operated by Great Western Railway.

Facilities 

The station has two entrances. The main entrance to the south has access to a taxi rank, some car parks and a bus stop, with steps down to The Malls shopping centre. A bridge over Churchill Way leads to the bus station. Festival Place can be accessed from The Malls or the bus station, while Festival Square and the Top of Town are located beyond the bus station. The northern entrance on Platform 4 gives access to a car park.
The south booking hall has ticket facilities (including ticket machines), information and a small shop. The station is staffed all day, and both entrances have ticket barriers.
There is a small café on the central island platform and another on Platform 4, as well as indoor waiting rooms.

Signalling

The station area and its various routes have been controlled by colour light signalling since the mid-1960s. It was announced in 2013 that a new Network Rail signalling operating centre would be built in Basingstoke; the contract was for £30 million. Several routes have had their signal control moved to Basingstoke, including the West of England main line  to Exmouth Jn in 2012  and the Poole -  -  section of the line to Weymouth in 2015.

Incidents 

On 19 December 2008 an over-height container on a freight train struck and damaged  of the canopy of platform 1.

Motive Power Depots 

The London and South Western Railway opened a locomotive shed on the south side of the main line, to the west of the station in 1839. This was closed in 1909 to make way for station enlargement. It was replaced by a larger structure on the north side of the line. This was closed by British Railways in March 1963, but remained in use as a servicing point until the end of steam in July 1967. It was demolished in 1969.

The Berks and Hants Railway opened a small shed to the east of the station on the north side of the line in 1850. This was closed by British Railways in November 1950, and demolished to make way for sidings.

Services 

Services at Basingstoke are operated by South Western Railway, Great Western Railway and CrossCountry. The off-peak service at the station in trains per hour is:

South Western Railway
 7 tph to London Waterloo
 1 tph to 
 1 tph to  via 

Great Western Railway
 2 tph to 

CrossCountry
 1 tp2h to  
 1 tp2h to  via

References

External links 

Basingstoke’s railway history in maps

Railway
Railway stations in Hampshire
DfT Category B stations
Railway stations in Great Britain opened in 1839
Former London and South Western Railway stations
Former Great Western Railway stations
Railway stations served by CrossCountry
Railway stations served by Great Western Railway
Railway stations served by South Western Railway